The Paris France Temple is a temple of the Church of Jesus Christ of Latter-day Saints (LDS Church) in Le Chesnay, a suburb of Paris, France,  and is located near Versailles. The Paris France Temple is the first temple built in Metropolitan France, and the second in France, after the Papeete Tahiti Temple.

History
On 15 July 2011 Church president Thomas S. Monson announced that a Latter-day Saint temple would be constructed in France. New temples are generally announced during a church general conference.  However, French newspapers reported the church's plans to build the temple at Le Chesnay, which prompted the early announcement, three months prior to the October 2011 conference.

Local opposition included Mayor Philippe Brillault who opposed the temple—planned on a site for an abandoned, asbestos-choked power plant—and proclaimed, "We weren’t overjoyed, because Mormons have an image that’s pretty much negative."

A public open house was held from 22 April 2017 to 13 May 2017, excluding Sundays. The temple was dedicated on 21 May 2017 by Henry B. Eyring.

In 2020, the Paris France Temple was closed in response to the coronavirus pandemic.

Gallery

See also

 Comparison of temples of The Church of Jesus Christ of Latter-day Saints
 List of temples of The Church of Jesus Christ of Latter-day Saints
 List of temples of The Church of Jesus Christ of Latter-day Saints by geographic region
 Temple architecture (Latter-day Saints)
 The Church of Jesus Christ of Latter-day Saints in France

References

External links
Paris France Temple Official site
Paris France Temple at ChurchofJesusChristTemples.org

2017 establishments in France
2017 in Christianity
21st-century Latter Day Saint temples
Buildings and structures in Yvelines
Churches in Paris
The Church of Jesus Christ of Latter-day Saints in France
Religious buildings and structures completed in 2017
21st-century churches in France
21st-century architecture in France